Villasmundo is a southern Italian hamlet (frazione) of Melilli, a municipality part of the Province of Syracuse, Sicily.

It has a population of 3,008.

References

External links
 

Frazioni of the Province of Syracuse